Oak Hill Cemetery is a cemetery in Cartersville, Georgia, United States. The cemetery was established in 1838 and bought by the city of Cartersville in 1850 from the Ebenezer Methodist Church (now the Sam Jones Memorial United Methodist Church). The cemetery is still open and available for new interments. The cemetery was also known simply as the Town Cemetery.

Notable interments 
 Amos T. Akerman, U.S. Attorney General
 Rebecca Latimer Felton, first woman U.S. Senator
 William Harrell Felton, U.S. Representative from Georgia
 Samuel Porter Jones, Methodist preacher
 Charles Henry Smith, humorist better known as Bill Arp
 Pierce M. B. Young, U.S. Representative from Georgia, major general in the Confederate States Army

References

Bibliography 

 
 

1838 establishments in Georgia (U.S. state)
Buildings and structures in Bartow County, Georgia
Cemeteries in Georgia (U.S. state)
Tourist attractions in Bartow County, Georgia